Apomempsis bufo is a species of beetle in the family Cerambycidae. It was described by Chevrolat in 1855. It is known from Nigeria and Gabon.

References

Morimopsini
Beetles described in 1855